Mahadeo Singh Khandela (born 23 September 1943) is an Indian politician. He is a member of the Indian National Congress and has been elected Member of Rajasthan Legislative Assembly (Five terms) and 15th Lok Sabha. Since January 2011, he has been the Union Minister of State, Tribal Affairs.
He handled the charge of Ministry of Road Transport and Highways for the period 2009 - 18 Jan 2011. He has also been elected to Rajasthan Legislative Assembly for five terms in the period 1980-2008.

By profession, Khandela is an agriculturist and did his M.A (Economics) from University of Rajasthan, Jaipur, Rajasthan.

References

External links
Mahadeo Singh Khandela Pdf document
Official biographical sketch in Parliament of India website

1943 births
Indian National Congress politicians
Living people
People from Sikar district
India MPs 2009–2014
Lok Sabha members from Rajasthan